All Over the Map is a stage performance by comedian and ventriloquist Jeff Dunham. The show was taped in ten countries. The DVD was released on 16 November 2014 within the United States.

Characters
 Walter - A grumpy, old Vietnam War veteran with an attitude who frequently complains about his wife.
 Bubba J - In Dunham's own words, "Pretty much just white-trash trailer-park." He talks about NASCAR and his love of beer.
 Achmed the Dead Terrorist / Jacques Merde - The skeletal corpse of an incompetent suicide bomber, whom Dunham uses to satirize the contemporary issue of terrorism. Achmed the Dead Terrorist was temporarily renamed 'Jacques Merde, the Dead French Terrorist' (Jacques Merde meaning "Jack Shit") for this television special due to a formal request from Malaysia.
 Peanut - A purple woozle from Micronesia described by Walter as "a frickin' Muppet on crack." He wears one red Converse shoe on his left foot.
 Jose jalapeno on a stick.

References

External links 

2014 direct-to-video films
2014 films
American comedy films
Stand-up comedy on DVD
2014 comedy films
2010s English-language films
2010s American films